I Don't Worry About a Thing is an album by American pianist, vocalist and composer Mose Allison recorded for the Atlantic label in 1962.

Reception

Allmusic awarded the album 4 stars with its review by Scott Yanow stating, "this was his breakthrough date. One of jazz's greatest lyricists, at the time, Allison was making the transition from being a pianist who occasionally sang to becoming a vocalist who also played his own unusual brand of piano. ...the set is one of Mose Allison's most significant recordings". The Penguin Guide to Jazz commented that, with its combination of material, "for some this is the classic Mose album".

Track listing
All compositions by Mose Allison except as indicated
 "I Don't Worry About a Thing" – 2:17
 "It Didn't Turn Out That Way" – 2:41
 "Your Mind Is on Vacation" – 2:35
 "Let Me See" (Count Basie, Harry Edison) – 4:08
 "Everything I Have Is Yours" (Burton Lane, Harold Adamson) – 4:07
 "Stand By" – 4:56
 "Idyll" – 4:15
 "The Well" – 3:30
 "Meet Me at No Special Place" (J. Russel Robinson, Arthur Terker, Harry Pyle) – 2:33
 "The Song Is Ended" (Irving Berlin) – 2:34

Personnel 
Mose Allison – piano, vocals
Addison Farmer – bass 
Osie Johnson – drums

References 

1962 albums
Mose Allison albums
Atlantic Records albums
Albums produced by Nesuhi Ertegun
Vocal jazz albums